The International Humic Substances Society (IHSS) is a scientific society that seeks to advance knowledge and research of natural organic matter (NOM) in soil and water. It was founded in Denver, Colorado, USA, on September 11, 1981 by scientists who saw a need for a society to bring together scientists in the coal, soil, and water sciences with interest in humic substances, and to provide opportunities for them to exchange ideas. Currently the society has about 900 members.

The IHSS maintains a collection of standard and reference samples of humic and fulvic acids from lignite, fresh water, a mineral soil, and organic soils plus reverse osmosis NOM from fresh waters that has not been fractionated. These material are used by research scientists around the world. The IHSS convenes biennial international conferences, which bring together scientists from the soil, coal, freshwater, and marine sciences.

References

External links
Official International Humic Substances Society website

Soil and crop science organizations
Earth sciences societies
Humic Substances Society